The Albanian Volleyball League is the top flight professional volleyball league competition in Albania, which currently features 7 clubs in 1 division. The league was founded in 1946, shortly after the formation of the Albanian Federation of Volleyball (FSHV) and it has remained the top flight men's volleyball competition in the country ever since. Dinamo Tirana have won the most championship titles with 25, but they have won just 2 titles since 1991, as Studenti later became a dominant club in the country, winning 14 out of a possible 18 titles between 2000-2016.

The league currently consists of 9 clubs in 1 division, but other formats have been used such as a division consisting of 7 clubs, as well as 2 divisions consisting of 12 clubs. Having started in 1946, it is one of the oldest and longest running volleyball competitions Balkans, and the sport experiences its peak in popularity during the Communist era in the 70s and 80s. Since the fall of communism in Albania in 1991 many volleyball clubs struggled to remain active due to a lack of funding, which led to the decline in the popularity of the sport as a whole in the country. However, since 1993 there has been some re-establishment of clubs that had previously folded, as private investment along with some state funded has allowed some of these clubs to continue functioning.

Current teams

Title holders

 1946 Ylli i Kuq
 1947 17 Nëntori
 1948 17 Nëntori
 1949 17 Nëntori
 1950 Partizani
 1951 Puna Durrës
 1952 Partizani
 1953 Partizani
 1954 Partizani
 1955 Partizani
 1956 Dinamo
 1957 Spartaku
 1958 Partizani
 1959 Partizani
 1960 Partizani
 1961 Partizani
 1962 Partizani
 1963 Lokomotiva
 1964 Dinamo
 1965 Dinamo
 1966 Dinamo
 1967 Dinamo
 1968–69 Dinamo
 1969–70 Dinamo
 1970–71 Dinamo
 1971–72 Dinamo
 1972–73 Partizani
 1973–74 Dinamo
 1974–75 Dinamo
 1975–76 Partizani
 1976–77 Dinamo
 1977–78 Dinamo
 1978–79 Dinamo
 1979–80 Dinamo
 1980–81 Partizani
 1981–82 Dinamo
 1982–83 Dinamo
 1983–84 Dinamo
 1984–85 Dinamo
 1985–86 Dinamo
 1986–87 17 Nëntori
 1987–88 17 Nëntori
 1988–89 Dinamo
 1989–90 Dinamo
 1990–91 Dinamo
 1991–92 Tirana
 1992–93 Tirana
 1993–94 Tirana
 1994–95 Studenti
 1995–96 Olimpik
 1996–97 Erzeni
 1997–98 Erzeni
 1998–99 Erzeni
 1999–00 Studenti
 2000–01 Teuta
 2001–02 Studenti
 2002–03 Studenti
 2003–04 Studenti
 2004–05 Studenti
 2005–06 Dinamo
 2006–07 Studenti
 2007–08 Studenti
 2008–09 Studenti
 2009–10 Studenti
 2010–11 Teuta
 2011–12 Studenti
 2012–13 Studenti
 2013–14 Studenti
 2014–15 Studenti
 2015–16 Studenti
 2016-17 Vllaznia
 2017-18 Erzeni
 2018-19 Partizani
 2019-20 cancelled due to pandemic
 2020-21 Partizani
 2021–22 Tirana

Performance by club

References

External links 
FSHV official website

See also
 Albanian Volleyball Federation
 Albanian Volleyball Cup
 Albanian Volleyball Supercup

 

Volleyball in Albania
Albania